Ronald Kampamba (born 26 May 1994 in Kitwe, Zambia) simply known as Sate Sate,  He is a key player of the Zambian Premier League club Nkana Football Club.

Career
He began his career with Nkana F.C. in Zambia.  He is also a member of the senior Zambia national football team.

Honours
 Zambian league top score 2 time in season 2012–2013, 2013–2014
 Award of footballer of the year 2014
 Youth player of the year 2013

References

Living people
People from Kitwe
Zambian footballers
Zambia international footballers
Zambian expatriate footballers
Challenger Pro League players
Nkana F.C. players
Lierse S.K. players
Wadi Degla SC players
Expatriate footballers in Egypt
Expatriate footballers in Belgium
2015 Africa Cup of Nations players
2015 Africa U-23 Cup of Nations players
1994 births
Association football forwards